Satariel is a death metal band from Sweden founded in 1993 in Boden.

History 
Satariel recorded its first demo in 1994; titled Thy Heavens' Fall, which consisted of traditional black metal sounds. The band released their debut album, Lady Lust Lilith, in 1998 on Pulverised Records. Over its first four albums up to 2007, the band increasingly mixed melodic death metal with black metal and technical death metal, sometimes drawing comparisons to Opeth and Insomnium. After a seven-year hiatus, Satariel released three-song EP White Ink: Chapter 1 in 2014.

Members

Current members 
 Pär Johansson – vocals
 Magnus Alakangas – guitar
 Mikael Granqvist – guitar
 Mikael Granbacke – bass guitar
 Robert Sundelin – drums

Past members 
 Mats Ömalm – guitar
 Andreas Nilzon – drums
 Fredrik Andersson – guitar
 Simon Johansson – guitar

Discography 
Lady Lust Lilith (Pulverised Records, 1998; re-released by Hammerheart Records, 2003)
Phobos & Deimos (Hammerheart Records, 2002)
Hydra (Cold Records/Regain Records/Candlelight Records, 2005)
Chifra (Pulverised Records, 2007)
White Ink: Chapter 1 (Alakangas Media, 2014)

References

External links 
 Satariel Homepage
 Satariel @ Myspace
 Satariel @ Last.fm
 Satariel @ Facebook

Swedish melodic death metal musical groups
Blackened death metal musical groups
Swedish black metal musical groups
Musical groups established in 1993